Alajuelita is a canton in the San José province of Costa Rica.

History 
Alajuelita was created on 4 June 1909 by decree 58. The first settlements in the area occurred by 1650. The name "Alajuelita" comes from a diminutive form of the name of Alajuela Province due to original settlers coming from that province.

Geography 
Alajuelita has an area of  km² and a mean elevation of  metres.

The odd-shaped canton reaches southwest from the suburbs of the national capital city of San José. It is delineated by the Tiribí River on the northeast, Cañas River on the east, Poás River on the southeast, and the Cerros de Escazú at it far southwestern end. The  is located in this canton along with the San Miguel Hill, whose metallic cross built at its peak is definitely one of the more beloved landmarks in Costa Rican Central Region.

Districts 
The canton of Alajuelita is subdivided into the following districts:
 Alajuelita
 San Josecito
 San Antonio
 Concepción
 San Felipe

Demographics 

For the 2011 census, Alajuelita had a population of  inhabitants.

Education 
 
 
Escuela San Felipe, founded 1966

Transportation

Road transportation 
The canton is covered by the following road routes:

References 

Cantons of San José Province
Populated places in San José Province